Strange Conquest is a 1946 American drama film directed by John Rawlins and written by Roy Chanslor. The film stars Jane Wyatt, Lowell Gilmore, Julie Bishop, Peter Cookson, Milburn Stone, Samuel S. Hinds and Abner Biberman. The film was released on May 10, 1946, by Universal Pictures.

Plot

Cast        
Jane Wyatt as Dr. Mary Palmer
Lowell Gilmore as Dr. Paul Harris
Julie Bishop as Virginia Sommers
Peter Cookson as William Sommers
Milburn Stone as Bert Morrow
Samuel S. Hinds as Dr. Graves
Abner Biberman as Molugi

References

External links
 

1946 films
American drama films
1946 drama films
Universal Pictures films
Films directed by John Rawlins
American black-and-white films
1940s English-language films
1940s American films